Giuseppe Ramani (15 July 1922 – 1973) was an Italian rower.

Ramani was born in 1922 in Koper, which was located in Italy at the time but was assigned to Yugoslavia after World War II.  He competed at the 1952 Summer Olympics in Helsinki with the men's coxed pair where they came fourth.

References

1922 births
1973 deaths
Italian male rowers
Olympic rowers of Italy
Rowers at the 1952 Summer Olympics
Sportspeople from Koper
European Rowing Championships medalists